Doris Barnett (born 22 May 1953) is a German politician and member of the SPD.

She represented Ludwigshafen/Frankenthal from 1998 to 2005. she contested the same seat in 2009, 2013 and 2017, failing to win but being elected on the party list.

Political career
Barnett has been a member of the German Bundestag since the 1994 federal elections, representing the Ludwigshafen/Frankenthal electoral district. In the 1994 and 1998 elections, her opponent of the CDU was incumbent Chancellor Helmut Kohl. For her election campaign in 1998, she recruited Marc S. Ellenbogen as her advisor.

Barnett has been part of the SPD parliamentary group’s leadership since 1998. Within the group, she served as a member of the working group on the world economy between 2003 and 2013.

Barnett was a member of the Committee on Labour and Social Affairs between 1994 and 2005. From 2002 to 2005, she also served on the parliament’s Council of Elders, which – among other duties – determines daily legislative agenda items and assigns committee chairpersons based on party representation.

Currently a member of the Budget Committee and its Sub-Committee on European Affairs, Barnett serves as her parliamentary group's rapporteur on the budget of the Federal Foreign Office, including Germany’s humanitarian aid. In this capacity, she also belongs to the SPD working group on the national budget. Since 2018, she has been chairing the Sub-Committee on European Affairs. In 2019, she also joined the Committee on Economic Affairs and Development.

In addition to her committee assignments, Barnett has been serving as deputy chairwoman of the German-Russian Parliamentary Friendship Group since 2018.

Barnett has been part of the German delegation to the Parliamentary Assembly of the Council of Europe since 2006, where she serves on the Committee on Political Affairs and Democracy. In addition, she has been the chairwoman of the German delegation to the Parliamentary Assembly of the Organization for Security and Co-operation in Europe (OSCE) since 2009. In that capacity, she chaired the Assembly’s observer mission during the 2019 Ukrainian presidential election.

Other activities

Corporate boards
 RSBK Strategie Beratung Kommunikation AG, Member of the Advisory Board
 Saint-Gobain ISOVER G+H AG, Member of the Supervisory Board

Non-profits
 Mannheim University of Applied Management Studies (HdWM), Member of the Board of Trustees
 German Friends of the Weizmann Institute of Science, Member
 Global Panel Foundation, Member of the Board of Directors
 Institute for European Politics (IEP), Member of the Board of Trustees 
 Deutsche Arbeitsgerichtsverband (DArbGV), Member
 German United Services Trade Union (ver.di), Member
 IG Bergbau, Chemie, Energie (IG BCE), Member

Recognition
 2016 – Order of Merit of the Federal Republic of Germany

References

External links
 Official Website 
 Official Website of the Global Panel Foundation

1953 births
Living people
Female members of the Bundestag
Members of the Bundestag for Rhineland-Palatinate
21st-century German women politicians
Recipients of the Cross of the Order of Merit of the Federal Republic of Germany
Members of the Bundestag 2017–2021
Members of the Bundestag 2013–2017
Members of the Bundestag 2009–2013
Members of the Bundestag 2005–2009
Members of the Bundestag 2002–2005
Members of the Bundestag 1998–2002
Members of the Bundestag 1994–1998
Members of the Bundestag for the Social Democratic Party of Germany
20th-century German women